Al Themaid (also spelled Al Thumaid) is a district in Qatar, located in the municipality of Al Rayyan.

In the 2015 census, it was listed as a district of zone no. 51 which has a population of 56,027 and also includes Izghawa, Gharrafat Al Rayyan, Al Gharrafa, Rawdat Egdaim, Bani Hajer and Al Seej.

It borders Rawdat Egdaim to the south and south-east, Izghawa 71 in Umm Salal Municipality to the east, Al Froosh in Umm Salal Municipality to the north, and  Rawdat Al Jahhaniya to the west.

History
Until the district's development in the 1960s, it was a popular hunting area for local falconry enthusiasts.

Etymology
An Arabic term, "thumaid" roughly translates to "shallow area that holds water". This name was given in recognition of a shallow well found here. This historic well is found in the district's southern portion in a rawda (depression).

References

Populated places in Al Rayyan